The 2008 Monte Paschi Eroica was the second edition of the Monte Paschi Eroica, later named Strade Bianche, held on 8 March 2008. It is a professional road bicycle race in Tuscany, Italy, starting in Gaiole in Chianti and finishing in Siena. The race was 181 km, including seven sectors of strade bianche, totaling 56,1 km of gravel road.

Swiss rider Fabian Cancellara won the race in a two-man sprint with Alessandro Ballan. The duo had caught early Canadian escapee Ryder Hesjedal at nine kilometer from the finish and headed into Siena's Piazza del Campo, where Cancellara took the win after hitting the front with 150 metres to go. 63 riders finished.

Results

References

External links 

Strade Bianche
Strade Bianche
Strade Bianche